The Automatic Ground Collision Avoidance System (Auto-GCAS) enhances safety by mitigating controlled flight into terrain (CFIT) accidents. The Auto-GCAS team was awarded the 2018 Collier Trophy for the design-integration and flight testing in the F-35, marking the year's greatest achievement in aeronautics. This team includes the Air Force Research Laboratory, Lockheed Martin, the F-35 Joint Program Office, the Defense Safety Oversight Council, and NASA.

The Automatic Ground Collision Avoidance System uses inputs from terrain mapping, aircraft location, and automation to avoid ground collisions. The Auto-GCAS system detects imminent ground contact and warns the pilot. If there is no pilot response, the Auto-GCAS takes control, maneuvering to avoid ground contact. When on a safe trajectory, with pilot awareness, control returns to the pilot. Pilot unresponsiveness can be attributed to many factors including: distraction, task saturation, incapacitation, and unconsciousness. The Auto-GCAS system successfully reduced the leading cause of F-16 pilot fatalities.

NASA started working on Auto-GCAS starting in 1997. The system was then jointly developed at the Lockheed Martin Skunk Works and at NASA. In July 2019, seven years ahead of schedule, Lockheed Martin began integration of Auto-GCAS into the F-35 fleet.

References

Aviation safety
Aircraft collision avoidance systems
Collier Trophy recipients
2018 in aviation
Aviation history of the United States
Air Force Research Laboratory
NASA
Research Lab